The selection of the Democratic Party's vice presidential candidate for the 1960 United States presidential election occurred at the party's national convention on August 13, 1960. After winning the presidential nomination on the first ballot of the 1960 Democratic National Convention, Massachusetts Senator John F. Kennedy turned his attention to picking a running mate. Kennedy chose Senate Majority Leader Lyndon B. Johnson, who had finished second on the presidential ballot, as his running mate. Johnson, a Protestant Texan, provided geographical and religious balance to a ticket led by a Catholic Northeasterner, but many liberals did not like the pick. Many were surprised both that Kennedy made the offer and that Johnson accepted the offer, as the two had been rivals for the 1960 presidential nomination. According to some accounts, Kennedy had offered the position to Johnson as a courtesy and expected Johnson to decline the offer; when Johnson accepted, Kennedy sent his brother, Robert F. Kennedy, to talk Johnson out of accepting the offer. However, Kennedy may have made the offer in earnest due to Johnson's appeal in the south, Johnson's friendly relationship with Speaker of the House Sam Rayburn, and Kennedy's desire to remove Johnson as Senate Majority Leader in favor of the more liberal Mike Mansfield. Regardless, Johnson decided that accepting the offer would be better for his political career and better position himself to become president, and so he chose to become Kennedy's running mate. The Democratic convention confirmed Johnson as the vice presidential nominee, although the delegation from Washington, D.C. attempted to select Minnesota Governor Orville Freeman instead.

The Kennedy–Johnson ticket narrowly defeated incumbent Vice President Richard Nixon and his running mate, former Massachusetts Senator Henry Cabot Lodge, in the 1960 election. Coincidental to the presidential election, Johnson was re-elected for a third term as a Senator from Texas but did not take office. Johnson eventually ascended to the presidency in 1963 upon the assassination of Kennedy.

Potential running mates

Finalists
Senate Majority Leader Lyndon Johnson of Texas
Minnesota Senator Hubert Humphrey
Missouri Senator Stuart Symington
Washington Senator Henry M. Jackson
Minnesota Governor Orville Freeman

Others
Florida Governor LeRoy Collins
Kansas Governor George Docking
California Senator Clair Engle
Iowa Governor Herschel C. Loveless
Wisconsin Governor Gaylord Nelson
United Automobile Workers President Walter Reuther of Michigan
Former Illinois Governor and two-time Democratic presidential nominee Adlai Stevenson II
Texas Senator Ralph Yarborough

See also
1960 Democratic National Convention
1960 Democratic Party presidential primaries

References

Vice presidency of the United States
John F. Kennedy
Lyndon B. Johnson
Hubert Humphrey
1960 United States presidential election